Parents and Children: Shake Well Before Using (Italian: Genitori & figli - Agitare bene prima dell'uso) is a 2010 Italian comedy film directed by Giovanni Veronesi.

Cast
Silvio Orlando as Gianni
Luciana Littizzetto as Luisa
Michele Placido as Alberto
Margherita Buy as Rossana
Elena Sofia Ricci as Clara
Emanuele Propizio as Patrizio "Ubaldolay"
Andrea Fachinetti as Gigio
Chiara Passarelli as Nina
Max Tortora as Mario
Piera Degli Esposti as Lea
Neva Leoni as Clarissa
Barbara Enrichi as the Principal
Matteo Amata as Ettore Amadesi
Gianna Nannini as herself

References

External links

2010 films
Films directed by Giovanni Veronesi
2010s Italian-language films
2010 comedy films
Italian comedy films
2010s Italian films